Estradiol tetrahydropyranyl ether may refer to:

 Estradiol 3-tetrahydropyranyl ether
 Estradiol 17β-tetrahydropyranyl ether

Estranes